The Libyan Special Forces (LSF), are an elite Libyan National Army unit, formed from a mixture of paratroopers, paramilitary forces and commandos. (They should not be confused with the similarly named Lightning Bolt Brigade (Sawaiq Brigade) which is part of the Zintan Brigades.) Prominent LSF commander Mahmoud al-Werfalli was indicted in 2017 and 2018 by the International Criminal Court for the war crime of murdering and ordering the murders of non-combatants, remaining at large .

Origins
The pro-government force emerged from a militia in 2010, during the Muammar Qaddafi government. In the 1990s, the Libyan Special Forces helped to suppress the rebellion of Libyan Islamic Fighting Group.

Composition and hierarchy
, they numbered about 5000 soldiers and reported to the Ministry of Defence.

In 2013, the Libyan Special Forces commander was Colonel Wanes Abu Khamadah. From 2011 to at least 2017, Mahmoud al-Werfalli was a member of the unit. Since December 2015, he held positions of command responsibility. , his title was Axes Commander and he held responsibility for at least one detention centre. In 2017 and 2018 he was indicted for the war crime of murdering and ordering the murders of non-combatants by the International Criminal Court (ICC) under Article 8(2)(c)(i) of the Rome Statute. , the ICC warrants for his arrest remained outstanding.

Benghazi Clashes
Libyan Special Forces came to prominence after its deployment in Benghazi in summer 2013, in an attempt to control the growing disorder. As a result, it came under repeated attacks and several of its officers killed. The force is reportedly popular in Benghazi, particularly in light of its stance against the Islamist Ansar al-Sharia group and because it is seen as a symbol of the reborn Libyan armed forces.

The Libyan Special Forces Brigade reportedly has had frictions with the Libya Shield Force, a government-sanctioned powerful militia; despite these frictions, between November and December 2013 the LSF Brigade fought the Ansar al-Sharia militia, suffering some losses.

At the end of July 2014 the Brigade was pushed out of its main base in Benghazi's Buatni district by Islamist fighters from the Shura Council of Benghazi Revolutionaries. A senior Libyan Special Forces official later claimed to the Libya Herald that LSF losses in Benghazi between the 21 and 30 July totaled some 63 dead and 200 wounded. Whilst the official was unsure of the number of Islamist dead, he claimed that it was in the dozens.

By 13 August 2014 the LSF presence in Benghazi was almost entirely limited to Benina Airport; the base of Operation Dignity's helicopter unit. Many of the forces top commanders were in turn operating out of the Operation Dignity stronghold of Tobruk.

Related voices 
Libyan National Army
Benghazi

References 

Military of Libya
Military units and formations established in 2010